Intermountain West Communications Company was an American telecommunications company, formerly owned by James E. Rogers (1938–2014), that remains as the licensee company for a number of local television stations in the United States, operated by Sinclair Broadcast Group and subsidiary companies Howard Stirk Holdings and Cunningham Broadcasting. The company was known for its liberal leaning.

Headquartered in Las Vegas, Nevada, IWCC was founded on October 1, 1979, following the purchase of KORK-TV, the NBC affiliate in Las Vegas, by local attorney James E. Rogers and 16 Las Vegas residents. KORK-TV was renamed KVBC after taking control and KSNV-DT (now KSNV) on July 9, 2010, and Rogers expanded Sunbelt's reach to include other stations in Arizona, Idaho, Montana, Nevada, New Mexico and Wyoming. In 2008, Sunbelt was renamed Intermountain West Communications Company; Rogers was at his summer home in Montana when he was asked about the "SUNBELT" license plate on his car when Montana wasn't a Sun Belt state. Most of IWCC's stations, prior to the gradual sale of them that began in 2013, were NBC affiliates.

On September 3, 2014, Intermountain West Communications announced that it would sell KSNV-DT to Sinclair Broadcast Group for $120 million. As Sinclair already owned a duopoly in Las Vegas, KVMY (channel 21) and KVCW (channel 33), the company planned to sell the license assets (though not the programming) of one of the three stations to comply with FCC ownership restrictions, with the divested station's programming being moved to the other stations. 80–85% of proceeds from the sale will go toward the formation of the Rogers Educational Foundation, which supported students and educators in Southern Nevada.

On November 1, 2014, KSNV began the process of swapping signals with KVMY; KVMY moved its MyNetworkTV programming to a subchannel of KVCW, which was replaced by a simulcast of KSNV-DT's programming. Additionally, the two stations swapped virtual channel numbers, which moved KVMY to channel 3, and KSNV to channel 21. On November 4, 2014, the call letters on KVMY's license were changed to KSNV, and the existing KSNV license changed its call letters to KVMY. These moves effectively put KSNV under Sinclair ownership using its existing channel 21 license. The previous channel 3 license was later sold to Howard Stirk Holdings. A similar swap occurred during Sinclair's acquisition of WCIV, in which its ABC programming and call sign were moved to another Sinclair-owned signal, and the previous WCIV channel 4 license (renamed WMMP) was sold to Howard Stirk Holdings, though the PSIP channel number was not swapped. When the sale closes, Sinclair would control half of those stations. It also created a situation in which a CW affiliate is the nominal senior partner in a duopoly involving an NBC affiliate and a "Big Four" station.

The company would remain as a technical going concern operating two stations until January 9, 2018, as the sales of KRNV-DT and KENV-DT were held up in the FCC due to unknown factors; both stations would eventually be sold instead to Cunningham Broadcasting, a company related to Sinclair that holds the licenses, with Sinclair operating the stations through joint operations and shared services agreements. The sale was approved on September 22, 2017, and completed on January 9, 2018.

Former stations

Television stations

Notes:
1 KFXP was owned by Compass Communications and it was operated by IWCC.
2 KMTF was owned by The Uhlmann Company and it was operated by IWCC.
3 Although Sunbelt took over ownership of KBJN in 2004, it had operated as a satellite of KVBC since signing on in 2001.

Radio stations

Note:
1 KVBC-FM was owned by Compass Communications and managed by Sunbelt Communications.

References

Companies based in Las Vegas
American companies established in 1979
Defunct broadcasting companies of the United States
Mass media companies disestablished in 2018